Prithviraj Sukumaran is an Indian actor, director, playback singer, producer, distributor and action choreographer who predominantly works in Malayalam films. Also occasionally, he also appears in Tamil, Hindi, and Telugu films. He has worked in both mainstream and in parallel films. Prithviraj made his acting debut in 2002 with the Malayalam film, Nandanam in a leading role. It was released after his second work Nakshathrakkannulla Rajakumaran Avanundoru Rajakumari. Since then, he has acted in more than 100 films.

His Tamil debut was in Kana Kandaen in 2005, and his other acclaimed film in that language include Parijatham, Mozhi, and Raavanan. He made Telugu and Bollywood (Hindi) debuts with Police Police (2010) and Aiyyaa (2012), respectively. Prithviraj has won two Kerala State Film Awards for Best Actorin 2006 for Vaasthavam, becoming the youngest recipient at age 24, and in 2012 for Ayalum Njanum Thammil and Celluloid. Since 2012, he was associated with and has co-produced films under the company August Cinema, before leaving them in 2017. In 2018, Prithviraj launched his own production house, Prithviraj Productions, debuting with 9 (2019) starring himself. He made his directorial debut with Lucifer starring Mohanlal, released in 2019. He made his second directorial with Bro Daddy, again starring Mohanlal. He next delivered hits like Driving Licence (2019), Ayyappanum Koshiyum (2020), Jana Gana Mana (2022) and Kaduva (2022)

As actor

Malayalam

Other language films

As director

As playback singer

As voice actor

As narrator
 Manjadikuru (2008)
 Oru Second Class Yathra (2015)
 Ivide (2015)
 Kanal (2015)
 Mohanlal (2018)
 Ranam (2018)
Radhe Shyam (Malayalam version) (2022)
 Jack N' Jill (2022) 
 Vendhu Thanindhathu Kaadu (2022) Trailer (Malayalam voice-over for Amazon Prime Video release)
 Ponniyin Selvan: I (2022) Malayalam version Trailer

See also
 List of awards and nominations received by Prithviraj Sukumaran

References

External links
 
 

Male actor filmographies
Indian filmographies